Atractus potschi is a species of snake in the family Colubridae. The species can be found in Brazil.

References 

Atractus
Reptiles of Brazil
Endemic fauna of Brazil
Reptiles described in 1995